"Long Live Comrade Mao for Ten Thousand Years" variously known in English as Long Live Chairman Mao for Ten Thousand Years or simple Long Live Chairman Mao is a Chinese patriotic song popularised during the Cultural Revolution. The title of the song is based on a popular slogan of the Red Guard, and was used widely during the Cultural Revolution in public demonstrations and rallies. However, since the end of the Mao era, the song has become more scarcely used due to its links to Mao's pervasive personality cult. However, the instrumental version of the song is still occasionally used. It is also used by the Young Pioneers of China and occasionally by the Communist Youth League of China.

Lyrics

See also

References

External links

 https://www.youtube.com/watch?v=AcU0tFeqMFI A video of the song being played

Historical national anthems
Cultural Revolution
Chinese patriotic songs
Maoist China propaganda songs
Asian anthems
Songs about Mao Zedong
Chinese military marches